Prairie Island  may refer to:

Prairie Island Indian Community in Minnesota
Prairie Island Nuclear Power Plant located nearby
Prairie Island Township, Merrick County, Nebraska